Bow School  is a comprehensive secondary school and sixth form for boys and girls, located in Bromley-by-Bow in the London Borough of Tower Hamlets, England. It has a roll of about 600 students and increasing. In September 2014 the school moved from the old site off Fairfield Road, Bow to a new site in Bromley-by-Bow a mile to the south-east by Bow Locks, in a new building designed by van Heyningen and Haward Architects. The school started accepting girls in the new school building, along with the move, into Year 7 and the numbers will grow so that by 2019, the school would have all its year groups mixed sex.

Subjects
Bow teaches a number of subjects, including at GCSE, stretched across a five period day throughout the week.

The school operates a sixth form provision in consortium with Langdon Park School, St Paul's Way Trust School and Mulberry Stepney Green Maths, Computing and Science College. The sixth form consortium is known as Sixth Form East. Head of sixth form at Bow School is Nadia Dellagana.

References

External links
Bow School online, the official site.
Website of Bow area by the students
Creative Partnership Project
TSIA is supported by the Annenberg Foundation
The MLEE Programme

Secondary schools in the London Borough of Tower Hamlets
Community schools in the London Borough of Tower Hamlets
Educational institutions established in 1985
1985 establishments in England
Bromley-by-Bow